End of Summer may refer to:

 The End of Summer, a 1961 Japanese film directed by Yasujirō Ozu
 End of Summer (1995 film), an American film directed by Linda Yellen
 End of Summer (2017 film), a Chinese film directed by Quan Zhou
 End of Summer (OVA), a 1994 anime for the Dōkyūsei video games
 End of Summer (play), a 1936 play by S. N. Behrman

See also 
 Summer's End (disambiguation)
 End of Winter, a 2014 South Korean film